Hoseynabad-e Olya (also Romanized as Ḩoseynābād-e ‘Olyā; also known as Hosein Abad Hoomeh, Ḩoseynābād, Ḩoseynābād-e Bālā, and Hoseynābād-e Hūmeh) is a village in Esmaili Rural District, Esmaili District, Anbarabad County, Kerman Province, Iran. At the 2006 census, its population was 83, in 15 families.

References 

Populated places in Anbarabad County